Bremen-Vegesack is a railway station serving the Vegesack district of Bremen. The station is part of the Bremen-Farge railway line served by Bremen S-Bahn line RS1, operated by NordWestBahn.

S-Bahn 
Currently, the RS1 line connects Bremen-Vegesack and Bremen Hbf every half hour, and every quarter-hour during peak hours. The line between Vegesack and Farge has a half-hourly service. The segment between Bremen Hbf and Verden is served hourly, and half-hourly at peak periods. The whole S-Bahn Network of the Bremen S-Bahn is part of the VBN.

Bus 
Bus lines run from the station square.

The bus lines 90 (Gröpelingen–Neuenkirchen), 91 and 92 (Gröpelingen–Rönnebeck), 94 (Gröpelingen–Bockhorn (or the depot in Blumenthal)) and 98 (Vegesack–Hammersbeck station) as well as N7 (main station–Neuenkirchen) are operated by the BSAG and as well the lines N8 (Vegesack–Schwanewede) and 677 (Vegesack–Uthlede) and N61 (Vegesack–Hagen). All bus lines are part of the VBN.

References 

Railway stations in Bremen (state)
Transport in Bremen (city)
Bremen S-Bahn
Railway stations in Germany opened in 1862